The Médée was a 46-gun frigate of the French Navy.

She took part in the Invasion of Algiers in 1830, and in the Battle of Veracruz in 1838.

In 1849, reconditioned as a hulk, she was renamed Muiron. She sank in 1883

See also
List of French sail frigates

Footnotes

Notes

Citations

References

Age of Sail frigates of France
1811 ships
Ariane-class frigates